The Culișer Canal is an artificial canal, starting from the river Crișul Negru upstream of the village of Tăut in Romania. Used mainly for irrigation and drainage, it crosses the city of Salonta and then flows into Hungary. Near Sarkadkeresztúr it joins the Hosszúfok-Határér-Kölesér canal, which discharges into the Körös north of Békés. The canal intercepts several tributaries of the right bank of the Crișul Negru, and crosses the Criș Collector Canal near Tulca.

References

Canals in Romania
CCuliser
CCuliser